Mullach Coire a' Chuir is a rugged mountain near Lochgoilhead in Argyll, Scotland and forms part of the well known Arrochar Alps range.  It lies to the west of Glen Goil and is visible from Lochgoilhead.

Mountains and hills of Argyll and Bute